Adebukola Oladipupo or Bukola Oladipupo  (born May 23, 1994) is a Nigerian actress who debuted on MTV Shuga.

Life
Oladipupo was born in London and educated in Lagos. She has two siblings. Oladipupo had her primary education in Bellina Nursery and Primary School Akoka, Lagos. She also attended Babcock High School and Caleb International School for her secondary education. She studied Management Information Systems at Covenant University and also studied drama in other courses. Oladipupo inspiration to go into acting came when she was still an undergraduate at Covenant University during a church service when the pastor told them to turn their talent into skills.

She successfully auditioned for MTV Shuga in 2015 where she was given what became the continuing role of "Faa". She puts her success down to the media mogul Mo Abudu who taught her to have self-belief. In 2015 she appeared in the first season of Indigo, Inevitable and The Other Me. In 2017 she appeared in the film Missing as the secretary playing herself.

Oladipupo was still in MTV Shuga as the character "Faa" went it went into a nightly mini series titled MTV Shuga Alone Together highlighting the problems of Coronavirus in April 2020. The show was broadcast for 60 nights and its backers include the World Health Organization. The series will be based in Nigeria, South Africa, Kenya and Côte d'Ivoire and the story will be explained with on-line conversations between the characters. All of the filming will be done by the actors themselves who include Jemima Osunde, Lerato Walaza, Sthandiwe Kgoroge, Uzoamaka Aniunoh and Mohau Cele.

Filmography

Films

TV Shows

See also 

 List of Nigerian Actresses

References

External links 

1994 births
Living people
People from Lagos
People from London
Yoruba actresses
Covenant University alumni
Nigerian television actresses
21st-century Nigerian actresses
Actresses from Lagos State
Residents of Lagos